Paul MacArthur (born 1981) is a shinty player for Newtonmore and the national shinty team of Scotland.

Career

The son of Newtonmore player and current Newtonmore manager Norman "Brick" MacArthur, Paul MacArthur is a strong physical presence in the resurgent Newtonmore team of the late 2000s–2010s.  He scored when Newtonmore broke their seven-year trophy hoodoo in 2009, lifting the MacTavish Cup.

In November 2011, the week after celebrating the retention of the Scottish Premier Division by posing naked at the top of Creag Dhu, MacArthur signed for Strathspey Thistle, the struggling Highland League football club from Grantown-on-Spey.

References

External links
MacArthur profile

Shinty players
Living people
1982 births
Strathspey Thistle F.C. players